Lommiswil railway station is a railway station in the municipality of Lommiswil, in the Swiss canton of Solothurn. It is an intermediate stop on the standard gauge Solothurn–Moutier line of BLS AG and is served by local trains only.

Services 
 the following services stop at Lommiswil:

References

External links 
 
 

Railway stations in the canton of Solothurn
BLS railway stations